G. P. Hamilton may refer to:
Gilbert P. Hamilton, English-American film company executive
Green Polonius Hamilton, African-American educator and author